Morne Seychellois is the highest peak in Seychelles. Morne Seychellois is located on the island of Mahé in the Morne Seychellois National Park.

References

External links
 Morne Seychellois National Park photo - Brian McMorrow photos at pbase.com

Mountains of Seychelles
Mahé, Seychelles
Highest points of countries